Admiral Lord Nelson School is a mixed co-educational secondary school in Portsmouth, Hampshire, England. The school, located on the eastern side of Portsmouth on Dundas Lane, opposite Ocean retail park and running parallel to the Eastern Road, is situated next to Langstone Harbour, and was constructed on a green field site.

Named after Horatio Nelson, admiral and hero of the British Royal Navy, with which it has already built ties, it was established in 1995 and specialises in Business and Enterprise to provide education for 11- to 16-year-old students. On opening it had an initial attendance of 170-year 7 students, which has subsequently grown substantially to around 1000. During this time, it has forged partnerships with the local business community.

Facilities 

Along with another Portsmouth state school, Milton Cross, Admiral Lord Nelson School is currently one of only two fully accessible schools in the city; providing numerous lifts for disabled students. The building also has several small two-wheeled trolleys for transporting disabled students up and down stairs during accidents and emergencies.

Sporting facilities include an outdoor all weather full size AstroTurf pitch and multi-use game area and an indoor fitness studio, these facilities along with a sports hall and a dance studio have become a useful asset to the wider community, as part of the Community Improvement Partnership in the city of Portsmouth.

Ofsted and governance 
The 2017 Ofsted Inspection awarded the school a rating of 2 ("Good") in a scale of 1 to 4, excellent to inadequate respectively.

The founding headteacher, Dianne Smith, was succeeded by the new headteacher Steven Labedz who was appointed by the governors at the beginning of 2006 having previously held the post of Associate Headteacher. Nys Hardingham is the current headteacher.

Academy status 
In October 2013, the school announced it was proposing to change its Governance status from community school to academy. The school formally converted to academy status on 1 April 2014. As a converter academy, the school is independent from both the local authority and any form of sponsor or chain of other academies. The school is funded directly from Central Government.

References

External links 
 

Secondary schools in Portsmouth
Educational institutions established in 1995
1995 establishments in England
Academies in Portsmouth